The Pongsan Line is an electrified freight-only railway line of the Korean State Railway in Pongsan County, North Hwanghae Province, North Korea, running from Pongsan on the P'yŏngbu Line to West Pongsan,

Services
The February 8 Cement Complex, one of the largest cement factories in North Korea, is located at West Pongsan. Much of the outbound traffic is cement destined for Kangdong on the P'yŏngdŏk Line, and for export via Haeju Port on the Hwanghae Ch'ŏngnyŏn Line.

Route 

A yellow background in the "Distance" box indicates that section of the line is not electrified.

References

Railway lines in North Korea
Standard gauge railways in North Korea